Malbas Jamous Nawal El Jack (born 17 October 1988 in Khartoum) is a Sudanese sprinter who specializes in the 400 metres. She represented her nation at the 2008 Summer Olympics.

International competitions

Personal bests
 200 metres – 23.97 s (2005)
 400 metres – 51.19 s (2005)
 400 metres hurdles – 57.86 s (2005)

References

 

1988 births
Living people
Sudanese female sprinters
People from Khartoum
Athletes (track and field) at the 2008 Summer Olympics
Athletes (track and field) at the 2015 African Games
Olympic athletes of Sudan
World Athletics Championships athletes for Sudan
African Games bronze medalists for Sudan
African Games medalists in athletics (track and field)
Olympic female sprinters
Athletes (track and field) at the 2007 All-Africa Games